Sony Music Entertainment Australia is the predominant record label operated by American parent company Sony Music Entertainment in Australia. SMEA also formerly published and distributed video games in Australia & New Zealand on behalf of Sony Imagesoft and Sony Electronic Publishing Europe until 1995.

Sony Music Entertainment Australia as of July 2017 also runs British multimedia Ministry of Sound Recordings' Australian operations on behalf of Sony Music UK, taking over from recently renamed TMRW Music, formerly a wholly owned subsidiary of Ministry of Sound until 2004.

Current artists

The follow is a list of artists current signed to Sony Music Australia:

 AC/DC
 A.D.K.O.B
 Adam Harvey
 Amy Shark
 Becca Hatch
 The Belligerents
 Billy Davis
 Carmouflage Rose
 Clews
 Conrad Sewell
 Cosmo's Midnight
 Darling Brando
 Daryl Braithwaite (also contracted to Columbia Records)
 David Campbell
 Delta Goodrem (also contracted to Columbia Records)
 DNA Songs
 Drapht
 Elk Road
 Emalia
 Finding Faith
 Gang of Youths
 Georgie Mae
 Graace
 Guy Sebastian (Australian Idol winner, 2003)
 Happiness Is Wealth
 Hollow Coves
 Holy Holy
 Human Nature
 Illy (since 2018)
 Isaiah Firebrace
 Jai Waetford (X Factor third place, 2013)
 Jessica Mauboy (Australian Idol runner-up, 2006)
 Joe Moore
 John Farnham
 Josh Pyke
 Karnivool
 Kira Puru
 Kota Banks
 Lah-Lah
 Lil Tr33zy
 LDRU
 Maddy Jane
 Mark Vincent (Australia's Got Talent winner, 2009)
 May-a
 Midnight Oil
 Mike Waters
 Montaigne
 Natalie Bassingthwaighte
 Northeast Party House
 O'Shea
 The Paper Kites
 Peking Duk
 Pete Murray
 Peter Garrett
 Pinkish Blu
 Rival Fire
 Robinson
 Roland Tings
 Ruel
 RÜFÜS DU SOL
 Samantha Jade (X Factor winner, 2012)
 Tash Sultana
 Tayla Mae
 Tim Wheatley
 Tones and I
 Triple One
 The Vanns
 The Veronicas

Former artists

 The 1975 (under licence from Dirty Hit)
 Akouo
 Alexander Biggs
 Altiyan Childs (X Factor winner, 2010)
 Amy Meredith
 Amy Pearson (Peppermint Blue/Columbia)
 Anise K
 Anthony Callea (Australian Idol runner-up, 2004)
 Ashley Burke (2013)
 Augie March
 Australia's Got Talent (2007–2013)
 Australian Idol (2003–2009)
 Axle Whitehead
 The X Factor Australia (2011–2017)
 Beau Ryan
 Bella Ferraro (X Factor fourth place, 2012)
 Bonnie Anderson (Australia's Got Talent winner, 2007)
 Brooke Fraser
 Brothers3 (X Factor third place, 2014)
 Carmada
 Casey Donovan (Australian Idol winner, 2004)
 Kate Ceberano
 Cassie Davis
 Chris Rose
 Channel Seven personalities and shows
 Cold Clinical Love
 Coldrain
 The Collective (X Factor third place, 2012)
 Cousin Tony's Brand New Firebird
 Cyrus Villanueva (X Factor winner, 2015)
 Dami Im (X Factor winner, 2013)
 Damien Leith (Australian Idol season 4 winner)
 Dean Ray (X Factor runner-up, 2014)
 Dewayne Everettsmith
 Didier Cohen
 Emily Williams (Australian Idol runner-up, 2005)
 Georgia Perry
 Geri Halliwell
 Glass Towers
 Helena
 Hi-5
 Halycon Drive
 Hazlett
 Hoodoo Gurus
 Jack Vidgen (Australia's Got Talent winner, 2011)
 Jackie Onassis
 Jackson McLaren
 The Janoskians
 Jason Owen (X Factor runner-up, 2012)
 Jess & Matt (X Factor third place, 2015)
 Jezzabell Doran
 Johnny Ruffo (X Factor third place, 2011)
 Jordan Jansen
 JOY
 Justice Crew (Australia's Got Talent winners 2010)
 Kate DeAraugo (Australian Idol winner, 2005)
 Kate Miller-Heidke
 Katie Noonan
 Kaz James
 Kids of 88
 Krill
 Kyle Bielfield 
 Leony
 Little Sea
 Lovers Electric
 The Lulu Raes
 M4sonic
 Marcus Santoro
 Marlisa Punzalan (X Factor winner, 2014)
 Matthew Hardy
 Max & Bianca 
 Michael Paynter
 Miracle
 Missy Lancaster
 Mr. Little Jeans
 MuteMath
 Natalie Gauci (Australian Idol winner, 2007)
 Nathaniel Willemse (X Factor finalist, 2012)
 Neighbours (1989–2011)
 Network Ten (1989–2011)
 Old Man River
 Olivia Newton-John
 Paulini (Australian Idol fourth place, 2003)
 The Prodigy (1992-2004; licensed from XL Recordings)
 Tim Freedman
 Rachael Beck
 Reece Mastin (X Factor winner, 2011)
 Reigan Derry (X Factor fourth place, 2014)
 Rogue Traders
 Scarlett Belle
 Stan Walker (Australian Idol winner, 2009)
 Taylor Henderson (X Factor runner up, 2013)
 Shannon Noll (Australian Idol runner-up, 2003)
 Skybombers
 Small Mercies
 So Fresh compilation albums (previously joint with Universal Music Australia)
 Smoothfm compilation albums
 So You Think You Can Dance Australia (2008–2010)
 Straalen McCallum
 Syndicate
 The Ten Tenors
 Third Degree (X Factor fourth place, 2013)
 Tim Omaji (Australia's Got Talent third place, 2011)
 Tonight Alive
 The Vines
 Wes Carr (Australian Idol winner, 2008)
 The Wiggles
 Young Divas
 Young Men Society (X Factor finalist, 2011)

 Way of the Eagle
 Will Sparks

Sony sub labels

Columbia Records/CBS Records

 Daryl Braithwaite
 Cherry
 Craig Maclachlan & Check 1/2
 Died Pretty
 Matt Finish
 Midnight Oil
 Moscos & Stone
 Nikka Costa
 The Atlantics
 The Fan Club
 Tina Arena
 Uncanny X-Men
 Wa Wa Nee

Epic Records
 CDB
 INXS
 Serious Young Insects
 The Poor

RCA Records
 ABBA
 Chicks Incorporated
 Divinyls
 Girl Overboard
 Girlfriend
 Natalie Imbruglia
 Max Merritt & The Meteors
 Oblivia
 Solid Citizens
 Southern Sons
 You Am I

Ariola Records
 Bodyjar
 Boom Crash Opera
 Divinyls
 GF4
 Jack Jones

Art Records (via BMG)
 Custard
 Melissa James
 Ratcat
 The Screaming Jets
 Wendy Matthews
 You Am I

Gotham Records, Transistor, JVC (via BMG)
 Bachelor Girl
 Trial Kennedy
 Merril Bainbridge
 Nikki Webster
 Katie Underwood
 Vanessa Amorosi

References

External links
 Sony Music Entertainment Australia

 
Record label distributors
IFPI members